This is a list of all closed-circuit television and pay-per-view events held by World Championship Wrestling (WCW) and its predecessor Jim Crockett Promotions (JCP). 

From 1983–1987, these events aired live on closed-circuit television under the National Wrestling Alliance (NWA) banner. Beginning in 1987, the events would air live on pay-per-view television. In November 1988, JCP sold its assets to the Turner Broadcasting System, which rebranded the company as World Championship Wrestling; they would later leave the NWA in 1991. In 1998 and early 1999, PPV events were promoted using the dual WCW/nWo brands.

In 2001, the World Wrestling Federation (now known as WWE) purchased the assets of WCW, including the video libraries of all previous NWA and WCW pay-per-views, and the ownership rights of the names of these events. To date WWE has only promoted one pay-per-view event using the name of a former WCW PPV, The Great American Bash, from 2004 until 2009. In 2012, it was rebooted as a live SmackDown special and in 2020, it was used as a two-week show as part of the NXT brand followed in 2021 by a special episode on one night. Also in 2020, the Halloween Havoc event name would be revived, once again as a special episode of NXT. In 2017, WWE revived the Starrcade name for a non-televised house show and then would show a portion of the 2018 and 2019 iterations of the event on the WWE Network.

Beginning in 2014, nearly all NWA and WCW pay-per-view events were made available on the WWE Network.

NWA (Jim Crockett Promotions) closed-circuit television events

1983

1984

1985

1986

NWA (Jim Crockett Promotions) pay-per-view events

1987

1988

NWA (World Championship Wrestling) pay-per-view events

1988

1989

1990

WCW pay-per-view events

1991

1992

1993

1994

1995

1996

1997

1998

1999

2000

2001

See also
Clash of the Champions
List of All Elite Wrestling pay-per-view events
List of ECW supercards and pay-per-view events
List of FMW supercards and pay-per-view events
List of Global Force Wrestling events and specials
List of Impact Wrestling pay-per-view events
List of Major League Wrestling events
List of National Wrestling Alliance pay-per-view events
List of NJPW pay-per-view events
List of Ring of Honor pay-per-view events
List of Smokey Mountain Wrestling supercard events
List of World Class Championship Wrestling Supercard events
List of WWA pay-per-view events
List of WWE pay-per-view and WWE Network events

References

Footnotes

External links
WCW PPVs and results

Jim Crockett Promotions shows
Professional wrestling-related lists